Pizzo Campo Tencia (or Campo Tencia) is a mountain in the Lepontine Alps, which lies in the canton of Ticino, Switzerland. Pizzo Campo Tencia is the highest peak located entirely inside the canton.

The mountain lies south of Lago di Morghirolo, between the Valle Leventina and Valle Maggia.

See also
List of mountains of Ticino
List of most isolated mountains of Switzerland

References

External links 
 Campo Tencia on SummitPost.org

Mountains of Ticino
Alpine three-thousanders
Lepontine Alps
Mountains of the Alps
Mountains of Switzerland